Over–under is a stand-up grappling position in which both combatants have one overhook and one underhook, and is the most common stand-up grappling position in mixed martial arts. The head is typically on the same side as the overhooked arm, to allow greater weight to be put on the opponent's underhooked arm, and hence preventing the opponent from using the underhooked arm effectively. The over–under position can be advanced into a pinch grip tie  by locking the hands behind the opponent's back.

See also
 Bear hug
 Collar-and-elbow position
 Double collar tie
 Double underhooks
 Pinch grip tie

References
 Danaher, John; Gracie, Renzo. Two Approaches to Fighting in the Clinch. URL last accessed February 11, 2006.

Grappling positions
Wrestling